"Crash & Burn" is a song by Swedish musician Basshunter, which appears on his fifth studio album, Calling Time.

Background
Song has a tempo of 140 beats per minute and is written in the key of A minor.

Track listing
 Digital download (20 June 2013)
 "Crash & Burn" – 3:09
 "Crash & Burn" (Extended Mix) – 4:54
 "Crash & Burn" (Josh Williams Remix) – 6:54
 "Crash & Burn" (Basshunter Remix) – 3:29
 "Crash & Burn" (Instrumental) – 3:09

 Digital download (22 July 2013)
 "Crash & Burn" – 3:09

 Digital download (2 August 2013)
 "Crash & Burn" – 3:09
 "Crash & Burn" (Extended Mix) – 4:54
 "Crash & Burn" (Josh Williams Remix) – 6:54
 "Crash & Burn" (Basshunter Remix) – 3:29

Release history

Music video 
Music video was directed by Farzad Bayat and uploaded by Basshunter on 24 June 2013.

Charts

Weekly charts

Year-end charts

Live performances 
Basshunter performed "Crash & Burn" on 13 July 2013 at Europa Plus Live in Moscow, where there was an estimated 300,000 spectators. It was noted that millions watched his act on TV.

References

External links
 

Basshunter songs
2013 singles
2013 songs
Ultra Music singles
Songs written by Adam Baptiste
Songs written by Basshunter
Song recordings produced by Basshunter